Peddapur is a village in Koratla mandal of Jagtial district, Telangana.

Villages in Jagtial district